Chereuta is a genus of moths of the family Xyloryctidae.

Species
 Chereuta anthracistis Meyrick, 1906
 Chereuta chalcistis Meyrick, 1906
 Chereuta tinthalea Meyrick, 1906

References

Xyloryctidae
Xyloryctidae genera